Jahanabad (also Romanized as Jahānābād) is a village in Azna Rural District, in the Central District of Khorramabad County, Lorestan Province, Iran. At the 2006 census, its population was 74, in 12 families.

References 

Towns and villages in Khorramabad County